Michael "Mikey" Maldonado (born July 2, 1998) is an American soccer player who plays for North Carolina FC in USL League One.

Playing career

San Antonio Runners SC
Maldonado spent two seasons with UPSL side San Antonio Runners SC in 2019 and 2020.

North Texas SC
Maldonado was signed by USL League One side North Texas SC on March 26, 2021. He had attended the club’s 2021 open tryout in January and was one of four players invited to participate in the team’s preseason training camp. He became the second player to be signed from the club's open tryouts after Bernard Kamungo. He made his professional debut on April 24, 2021, starting in a 4–2 win over Fort Lauderdale CF.

Forward Madison FC
On March 14, 2022, Forward Madison FC, also of USL League One, announced they had signed Maldonado for the 2022 season, indicating he could play right back, center back or central midfield. Maldonado was named to the 2022 USL League One All-League Second Team in October 2022.

North Carolina FC
Maldonado signed with North Carolina FC on January 6, 2023.

References 

1998 births
American soccer players
Association football defenders
Living people
North Texas SC players
Soccer players from San Antonio
USL League One players
Forward Madison FC players
North Carolina FC players
United Premier Soccer League players